Thomas Joshua Wells (born 15 March 1993) is an ex professional English cricketer active from 2013 who used to play for Leicestershire, now plying his trade for Cornwall Cricket League leaders, Penzance CC and Cornwall County Cricket Club. He is a righthanded batsman who bowls right arm medium fast.

References

External links
 

1993 births
English cricketers
Leicestershire cricketers
Living people
English cricketers of the 21st century
People from Grantham